Pakistan and Yemen enjoy excellent relations as both share bonds of religion, culture and values. Relations date back when both nations were part of trading routes of ancient times. Parts of the land that now constitutes Pakistan and the territory of Yemen were part of the Persian Empire, and later of Umayyad and Abbasid Caliphates.
Yemen has a spiritual role in history of Pakistan. Zaydi school of Yemen produced a soldier Abdullah Ashtar who was a patrilineal descendant of the Islamic prophet Muhammad through the Hasani branch. He was killed by Abbasid dynasty and he is buried in Karachi, Pakistan. He is famous as a Sufi saint in Pakistan. Both countries seek to further boost bilateral ties and cooperation, and Yemen has confirmed Pakistan is in support of resolving the crisis through means of dialogue.

See also 
 Pakistanis in Yemen
 Yemenis in Pakistan
 Foreign relations of Pakistan
 Foreign relations of Yemen

References

External links 
 Embassy of Pakistan in Yemen
 [goo.gl/fb/nqd7NT|Yemen and Pakistan Mediation]

 
Yemen
Bilateral relations of Yemen